HMS C10 was one of 38 C-class submarines built for the Royal Navy in the first decade of the 20th century. The boat survived the First World War and was sold for scrap in 1922.

Design and description
The C class was essentially a repeat of the preceding B class, albeit with better performance underwater. They displaced  on the surface and  submerged. The C-class submarines had a crew of two officers and fourteen ratings.

For surface running, the boats were powered by a single 16-cylinder  Vickers petrol engine that drove one propeller shaft. When submerged the propeller was driven by a  electric motor. They could reach  on the surface and  underwater.

The boats were armed with two 18-inch (45 cm) torpedo tubes in the bow. They could carry a pair of reload torpedoes, but generally did not as they would have to remove an equal weight of fuel in compensation.

Construction and career
C10 was laid down on 30 January 1906 by Vickers at their Barrow-in-Furness shipyard, launched on 15 April 1907, and completed on 13 July. During World War I, the boat was generally used for coastal defence and training in home waters.

C10 was part of the 6th Submarine Flotilla, based on the Humber, but on 8 September 1914, the six submarines of the flotilla were sent to Queensferry in the Firth of Forth to search for and attack German submarines that had been active in the area. On 17 September, after the British battlecruiser force had left the Forth for Scapa Flow, the 6th Flotilla was ordered to Cromaty to defend the approaches to Cromaty and Scapa Flow.

Although one man was killed and a second was wounded, the submarine survived. C10 was sold for scrap in July 1922.

Notes

References

External links
 MaritimeQuest HMS C-10 Pages

 

British C-class submarines
Ships built in Barrow-in-Furness
Royal Navy ship names
1907 ships